The Gourishankar is a progressive rock band from Russia formed in 2001 by university friends guitarist Alexandr "Nomy" Agranovich ( Agranson) and keyboardist Doran Usher in the Russian provincial city Syktyvkar.

In 2002 the band released their debut demo tape Integral Symphony followed in 2003 by their first studio album, Close Grip. Their second studio album 2nd Hands, was recorded in 2006 and was released by Unicorn Digital on March 15, 2007. The album revealed their unique style of music, which blends many musical genres. 2nd Hands was nominated for the Prog Awards 2007 within "Best Foreign Band" section, nominated for best debut of the year at Deutsche progressive pages and took second place. The album became the best-selling release in 2007 on the label Unicorn Digital. Close Grip was rereleased by Unicorn Digital in 2008.

In 2015, the jazz label ArtBeat Music was all deluxe editions heritage group called the 1st Decade, including rare recordings and demo tapes, as an anthology. It was also released edition classic album 2nd Hands on vinyl.

The third studio album The World Unreal was released at Russia on January 14, 2016 through ArtBeat Music.

Members 

Current
 Jason Offen – vocals (2010 – present)
 Nomy Agranson – guitars, basses, vocals, keyboards (2002 – present)
 Svetoslav Bogdanov – drums (2010 – present)

Previous
 Doran Usher – keyboards (2002 – 2011)
 Vlad MJ Whiner – vocals (2003 – 2008)
 Cat Heady – drums (2003 – 2008)
 Maxim Sivkov – drums (2008)
 Mikhail Muhachev – bass (2008)

Guest
 Vladimir Rastorguev – viola, cello
 Dmitry Ulyashev – saxophone, flute
 Alla Izverskaya – backing vocals
 Alexander Vetkhov – drums
 Nail Maxonov – drums

Discography 
Demos
 Integral Symphony (2002, demo EP, self-release)

Studio albums
 Close Grip (2003, LP, CD, self-released)
 2nd Hands (2007, LP CD, Unicorn Digital)
 The World Unreal (2016, LP, CD, ArtBeat Music)

Reissues
 Close Grip (2008, LP, reissue, at Russia MALS Rec., other countries — Unicorn Digital)
 The Gourishankar Anthology. 1st Decade (2015, 2CD-BOX deluxe edition, ArtBeat Music, Russia)
 2nd Hands (2015, vinyl edition, ArtBeat Music, Russia)
 Close Grip (2015, club edition, ArtBeat Music, Russia)
 2nd Hands (2015, club edition, ArtBeat Music, Russia)
 The World Unreal (2016, club edition, ArtBeat Music, Russia)

References

External links 
 Official Bandcamp Page
 Official Facebook Page
 Official VK Page
 ProgArchives.com Page
 The mountain similar to Everest. The interview with the band "Gourishankar"

Russian art rock groups
Russian progressive rock groups
Russian experimental rock groups
Unicorn Digital artists